Bid Korpeh-ye Vosta (also Romanized as Bīd Korpeh-ye Vosţá; also known as Bīd Korpeh, Bīdkorpeh-ye Vasaţ, and Birkarih Vosta) is a village in Kamazan-e Sofla Rural District, Zand District, Malayer County, Hamadan Province, Iran. At the 2006 census, its population was 73, in 24 families.

References 

Populated places in Malayer County